Kobol, or Koguman, is a Papuan language of Madang Province, Papua New Guinea.

References

Omosan languages
Languages of Madang Province